The 2008–09 Columbus Blue Jackets season was the ninth National Hockey League (NHL) season in Columbus, Ohio. On April 8, 2009, the Blue Jackets clinched a playoff berth after a shootout victory against the Chicago Blackhawks, the first berth in team history.

Preseason
The Jackets selected Russian forward Nikita Filatov with the sixth overall pick at the 2008 NHL Entry Draft. Filatov made an immediate impact with Columbus, scoring a goal in his NHL debut against the Nashville Predators. Columbus was rather aggressive in free agency, signing proven forward Kristian Huselius, and solidifying the defensive core with veteran Mike Commodore. General Manager Scott Howson also engineered two key pre-season trades, trading a draft pick to the Philadelphia Flyers for R. J. Umberger, and trading stars Nikolay Zherdev and Dan Fritsche to the New York Rangers in exchange for defensemen Fedor Tyutin and Christian Backman.

Regular season
Rookie goaltender Steve Mason, who missed the first month of the season following knee surgery, led the Blue Jackets into playoff contention at the All-Star break. Recalled from the American Hockey League's Syracuse Crunch following Pascal Leclaire's injury, Mason was named the Rookie of the Month by the NHL for November after recording five wins in eight decisions, including two shutouts.  He again won Rookie of the Month honors in December, and was named to the YoungStars team at the 2009 All-Star Game in Montreal, though he declined to play after suffering back spasms.  Captain Rick Nash was the team's representative at the All-Star Game, his fourth appearance at the game. Rookie Nikita Filatov scored his first career hat trick on January 10, 2009, in a 4–2 win against the Minnesota Wild. Filatov's achievement marked the first hat trick by a Blue Jackets rookie. On the eve of the NHL trade deadline, Columbus traded recently oft-injured goaltender Pascal Leclaire and a draft pick to the Ottawa Senators for forward Antoine Vermette. Vermette made an instant impact with the club, racking up seven points in his first six games.

The Blue Jackets struggled on the power play, finishing 30th in power-play goals (41) and power-play percentage (12.73%). They also had the most shutouts of any team in the league, with 11.

Divisional standings

Conference standings

Schedule and results

Pre-season

Regular season

Playoffs

The Blue Jackets have reached the Stanley Cup Playoffs for the first time in franchise history.

Player statistics

Skaters

Goaltenders

†Denotes player spent time with another team before joining Blue Jackets. Stats reflect time with the Blue Jackets only.
‡Traded mid-season
Italics denotes franchise record

Awards and records

Awards

Steve Mason - Calder Memorial Trophy

Rick Nash – NHL Foundation Player Award

Records

Milestones

Transactions

Trades

Free agents

Claimed from waivers

Draft picks
The Blue Jackets entered the 2008 NHL Entry Draft in Ottawa with the sixth overall selection. Columbus drafted Russian forward Nikita Filatov with the pick.  Filatov started the season with the Jackets' American Hockey League affiliate, scoring two goals in two games for the Syracuse Crunch before being recalled to the NHL.  Filatov made his NHL debut on October 17, scoring a goal against the Nashville Predators.

See also
2008–09 NHL season

Farm teams

American Hockey League
Syracuse Crunch

ECHL
Johnstown Chiefs: GM Scott Howson announced on August 22, 2008 that the Blue Jackets reached an agreement with the Johnstown Chiefs to serve as the club's ECHL affiliate for the 2008–09 season, replacing the Elmira Jackals.

References

Player stats: Columbus Blue Jackets player stats on espn.com
Game log: Columbus Blue Jackets game log on espn.com
Team standings: NHL standings on espn.com

Columbus Blue Jackets seasons
Columbus Blue Jackets season, 2008-09
Colum
Blue
Blue